Jill Jones (born 1962), is an American singer and songwriter

Jill Jones may also refer to:

 Jill Jones (curler), American curler
 Jill Jones (poet) (born 1951), Australian poet
 Jill Marie Jones (born 1975), American actress
 Jill Jones (album), 1987

See also
 Jones (surname)
 Jones (disambiguation)